Roy Herrick (22 July 1936 – 11 October 1988) was a British actor.

His television credits include: Danger Man, Public Eye, Callan, The Regiment, Colditz, Survivors, Doctor Who (in the serials The Reign of Terror, The Face of Evil and The Invisible Enemy), Pardon My Genie, George and Mildred, Robin’s Nest, Tenko, The Fourth Arm, Mr. Palfrey of Westminster and Howards' Way.

Roy also played the barman in two episodes of You're Only Young Twice - 'The Missing Ring' and 'The Home Perm'.

Selected filmography
 All the Right Noises (1971)

References

External links
 

1936 births
1988 deaths
British male television actors
20th-century British male actors